L'Express is a French weekly news magazine.

L'Express may also refer to:

L'Express Airlines, a commuter airline in the southern United States between 1989 and 1992
L'Express de Madagascar, a French-language daily newspaper published in Madagascar
L'Express de Timmins, a Canadian weekly newspaper
L'Express (Toronto) (formerly L'Express de Toronto), a French-language weekly newspaper published in Toronto, Canada
L'Express (Mauritius), a daily newspaper published in Mauritius since 1963
L'Express (Neuchâtel), a daily newspaper published in Neuchâtel, Switzerland
L'Express (Ottawa), a Canadian weekly newspaper
Le Vif/L'Express, a French-language weekly news magazine published in Brussels, Belgium

See also
Express (disambiguation)